Celaenorrhinus sanjeensis is a species of butterfly in the family Hesperiidae. It is found in south-central Tanzania. The habitat consists of forests.

The length of the forewings is 23.5 mm for males and 24.2 mm for females. The ground colour is blackish brown with a cream-coloured band on the forewings of the males. This band is white in females.

References

Endemic fauna of Tanzania
Butterflies described in 1990
sanjeensis